Phocylides is a genus of primitive weevils in the family of beetles known as Brentidae. There is at least one described species in Phocylides, P. bicolor.

References

Further reading

 
 
 
 
 
 
 

Brentidae